Jiřina Čermáková (17 November 1944 – 17 November 2019) was a Czech field hockey player who competed in the 1980 Summer Olympics. She was born in Prague. After her playing career, she became a field hockey coach.

References

External links
 

1944 births
2019 deaths
Sportspeople from Prague
Czech female field hockey players
Czech sports coaches
Olympic field hockey players of Czechoslovakia
Field hockey players at the 1980 Summer Olympics
Olympic silver medalists for Czechoslovakia
Olympic medalists in field hockey
Medalists at the 1980 Summer Olympics